Kurmanayevo (Qormanay) is a rural locality (a village) in Urshaksky Selsoviet, Aurgazinsky District, Bashkortostan, Russia. The population was 306 as of 2010. There are 15 streets.

Geography 
Kurmanayevo is located 26 km northwest of Tolbazy (the district's administrative centre) by road. Staroabsalyamovo is the nearest rural locality.

References 

Rural localities in Aurgazinsky District
Ufa Governorate